Xingfu station is a station on the Taipei Metro's Circular line when it was opened on 31 January 2020. It is located in Xinzhuang District, New Taipei, Taiwan, at the intersection of Siyuan Road and Xingfu East Road.

Station Layout

Exits
Exit 1: Intersection of Siyuan Rd. and Ln. 296, Siyuan Rd.	
Exit 2: Intersection of Siyuan Rd. and Xingfu E. Rd.

Around the station
Touqian Sports Park (180m east of Exit 1)
PX Mart Xinzhuang Xingfu Store (450m west of Exit 2)
Sukiya Xingfu Store (130m northwest of Exit 2)
Fu Shou Street Night Market (250m west of Exit 2)
Fushou Park (450m northwest of Exit 2)
Sixian Park (500m southwest of Exit 2)
Huacheng Park (化成公園) (400m southeast of Exit 2)
中港大排親水步道 (850m west of Exit 2)

References

2020 establishments in Taiwan
Circular line stations (Taipei Metro)
Railway stations opened in 2020
Xinzhuang District